Lascoria ambigualis, the ambiguous moth, is a litter moth of the family Erebidae. The species was first described by Francis Walker in 1866. It is found in the US from Wisconsin to Maine, south to Florida and Texas.

The wingspan is 21–25 mm. Adults are on wing from April to September. There are two generations in Connecticut and multiple broods in Missouri.

The larvae feed on Chrysanthemum species, as well as Aster, blackberry and Verbesina. Larvae have also been reared on dead leaves.

References

Herminiinae
Moths of North America
Moths described in 1866